Self-destructive behavior is any behavior that is harmful or potentially harmful towards the person who engages in the behavior.

Self-destructive behaviors have been shown by many people throughout the years. It is on a continuum, with one extreme end of the scale being suicide. Self-destructive actions may be deliberate, born of impulse, or developed as a habit. The term however tends to be applied toward self-destruction that either is fatal, or is potentially habit-forming or addictive and thus potentially fatal. Self-destructive behavior is often associated with mental illnesses such as attention deficit hyperactivity disorder, borderline personality disorder or schizophrenia.

Origin
Self-destructive behavior was first studied in 1895 by Freud and Ferenczi when they first recognized how traumatic experiences affected the development of children. Freud and Ferenczi noticed that children who were raised in an unhealthy environment were more often the ones to act out and take part in self-destructive behavior.

Freud concluded that self-destructive behavior is influenced by one's ego or superego and aggression. Depending on how strongly influenced one is, it will increase the intensity of one's destructive behavior. Guilt is a leading factor for one's superego. For instance, growing up with alcoholic parents can increase one's self-destructive behavior because they feel guilty that they didn't provide them with the help they needed. Since they failed to help their parents overcome these obstacles, they feel as if their parents failed because of them. Then, they use harming themselves as a coping mechanism to their guilt and failure.

Freud additionally states that the aggression in self-destructive behavior is influenced by a personal motive. Just as cultural and environmental factors can play an important role of this, social factors can as well. For example, say a child was bullied all through middle school, the way to get rid of his pain the child would take action in self-destructive behavior, such as self-harm or yelling.

With investigations Freud and Ferenczi formed a hypothesis that people with self-destructive behavior suffer from "forbidden fantasies, not memories," meaning that since the action isn't supposed to be done, self-destructive people get a stronger drive to take part in these actions.

Self-destructive behavior comes in many different forms that varies from person to person. Therefore, superego and aggression is different in every person.

Forms

Self-destructive behavior may be used as a coping mechanism when one is overwhelmed. For example, faced with a pressing scholastic assessment, someone may choose to sabotage their work rather than cope with the stress. This would make submission of (or passing) the assessment impossible, but remove the worry associated with it.

Self-destructive behavior may also manifest itself in an active attempt to drive away other people. For example, they may fear that they will "mess up" a relationship. Rather than deal with this fear, socially self-destructive individuals engage in annoying or alienating behavior, so that others will reject them first.

More obvious forms of self-destruction are eating disorders, alcohol use disorder, substance use disorders, sex addiction, self-injury, body-focused repetitive behavior and suicide attempts.

An important aspect of self-destructive behavior is the inability to handle the stress stemming from an individual's lack of self-confidence – for example in a relationship, whether the other person is truly faithful ("how can they love someone like me?"); at work or school, whether the realization of assignments and deadlines is possible ("there is no way I can complete all my work on time"). Self-destructive people usually lack healthier coping mechanisms, like asserting personal boundaries. As a result, they tend to feel that showing they are incompetent is the only way to untangle themselves from demands.

Successful individuals may self-destructively sabotage their own achievements; this may stem from a feeling of anxiety, unworthiness, or from an impulsive desire to repeat the "climb to the top."

Self-destructive behavior is often considered to be synonymous with self-harm, but this is not accurate. Self-harm is an extreme form of self-destructive behavior, but it may appear in many other guises. Just as personal experience can affect how extreme one's self-destructive behavior is, self-harm reflects this. Overall, personal experience and mental health problems is what affects self-harm.

Causes

Childhood trauma via sexual and physical abuse, as well as disrupted parental care, have been linked with self-destructive behavior. Usually, behavior like this results from the lack of realization of healthy coping mechanisms. Because there is not a lot of focus on specific mental health problems, such as self-destructive behavior, people are not being educated on specific ways that could benefit or even prevent these people from acting out.

Additionally, people who have experienced some form of trauma, such as abuse or neglect, can develop psychological issues that can lead to bigger problems.
Aside from this, a need for attention or a feel good sensation can ultimately cause this behavior. A prime example of this would be addiction to drugs or alcohol. In the beginning stages, people have the tendency to ease their way into these unhealthy behaviors because it gives them a pleasurable sensation. However, as time goes on, it becomes a habit that they can not stop and they begin to lose these great feelings easily. When these feelings stop, self-destructive behavior enhances because they are not able to provide themselves with that feeling that makes mental or physical pain go away.

Treatment
Changing one's self-destructive behavior can be difficult, and may include major stages that one passes through on the way to recovery. The stages founded by Prochaska and DiClemente (1982) included precontemplation, contemplation, preparation, action, maintenance, and termination. For body-focused repetitive behaviors, such as trichotillomania and nail-biting, habit reversal training and decoupling are effective according to meta-analytic evidence.

See also
 27 Club
 Cupio dissolvi
 Death drive
 Borderline personality disorder
 Emotional self-regulation
 Histrionic personality disorder
 Self-defeating personality disorder
Self-sabotage
 Post-traumatic stress disorder

References

Symptoms and signs of mental disorders
Abuse